Horstiella is a genus of mites in the family Acaridae.

Species
 Horstiella armata Türk, 1949
 Horstiella concentrica Ochoa & O'Connor, 2000
 Horstiella megamyzidos Ochoa & O'Connor, 2000
 Horstiella mourei Ochoa & O'Connor, 2000
 Horstiella quadrata Ochoa & O'Connor, 2000
 Horstiella snellingi Ochoa & O'Connor, 2000
 Horstiella variabilis Ochoa & O'Connor, 2000

References

Acaridae